Siparuna eggersii is a scrambling, large shrub in the Siparunaceae family. It is endemic to Ecuador, where it is endangered due to habitat destruction. It has glabrous leaves and fig-like, red fruit with a lemon scent.

References

Flora of Ecuador
Siparunaceae
Endangered plants
Taxonomy articles created by Polbot